Overland Adventure: The Story of the 1954 Redex Reliability Trial is a 1954 documentary directed by Ken G. Hall about the 1954 Redex Reliability Trial.

It appears to have also been known as Tough Assignment.

References

External links
Overland Adventure at Australian Screen Online
Overland Adventure at IMDb
Overland Adventure at National Film and Sound Archive

Australian documentary films